is a Japanese professional footballer.

Career

Eunos Crescent
After arriving from Japan to try and secure a professional contract with a S.League side, Nakatake found that every team had filled their five-man foreign player roster. However, he refused to give up and played instead in the amateur National Football League with Eunos Crescent FC.

Hougang United
Having impressed in the NFL with Eunos, Nakatake was signed by the Cheetahs for the 2014 S.League season, filling one of five foreign players spot. In his first season as a professional footballer, he made a total of 31 appearances, scoring one goal.

Nakatake was the only foreign player on Hougang's 2014 squad that was retained by the Cheetahs for the 2015 S.League season.

Kuantan FA
In 2016, Nakatake signed for Malaysia Premier League side Kuantan FA, playing for two seasons with the club.

PDRM FA
Having been released from his Kuantan FA contract, Nakatake signed with another Malaysia Premier League side PDRM FA for the 2018 season.

Career statistics

Club

References

Hougang United FC players
Negeri Sembilan FA players
1990 births
Living people
Japanese footballers
Japanese expatriates in Malaysia
Expatriate footballers in Malaysia
Association football midfielders